Brohlbach is a river of Rhineland-Palatinate, Germany. It is a left tributary of the Rhine at Brohl-Lützing.

The valley of the Brohlbach is called Brohltal (Brohl Valley), not Brohlbachtal (Brohlbach Valley).

See also
List of rivers of Rhineland-Palatinate

References

Rivers of Rhineland-Palatinate
Rivers of Germany